Western Province was an electorate of the Victorian Legislative Council (Australia), the upper house of the Parliament of Victoria. Victoria was a colony in Australia when Western Province was created. From Federation in 1901, Victoria was a state in the Commonwealth of Australia.

Western Province was one of the six original upper house Provinces of the bi-cameral Victorian Parliament created in November 1856.

Western Province was defined in the Victorian Constitution Act, 1855, as : "Including the Counties of Ripon, Hampden, Heytesbury, Villiers, Normanby, Dundas, and Follett."

In 1882, several new Provinces were created, including Nelson Province and Wellington Province, the numbers of members elected for Western Province was reduced to three from this time. Another redistribution in 1904 reduced the number of members to two.

In 2006, the Western Province (along with all the other provinces in the Legislative Council) was abolished and replaced by regions. All of the area covered by Western Province is contained in the larger Western Victoria Region.

Members for Western Province
Five members initially until 1882. Three from 1882 until 1904, then two members from 1904 until abolition in 2006.

 Rodda resigned in July 1943, re-elected in October 1943

Election results

References

Former electoral provinces of Victoria (Australia)
1856 establishments in Australia
2006 disestablishments in Australia